The little Mexican toad (Anaxyrus kelloggi), formerly Bufo kelloggi, is a species of toad in the family Bufonidae. It is endemic to Mexico and found in the Pacific coastal plains between central Sonora and Nayarit. The specific name honors Remington Kellogg, who was an American zoologist and a director of the United States National Museum.

It is tolerant to human disturbance and can breed in artificial water bodies such as dams.

References

Anaxyrus
Endemic amphibians of Mexico
Sinaloan dry forests
Amphibians described in 1936
Taxonomy articles created by Polbot
Sonoran–Sinaloan transition subtropical dry forest